Let Them Talk (transliterated: Pust govoryat) is a Russian talk show hosted by Dmitry Borisov. It invites guests to come before a studio audience to address personal issues; crime, drug abuse, suicide, prostitution, infidelity as well as society issues; attacks, migration, international relations.

The program is inspired by the American Jerry Springer show, although it was originally conceived to be a  clone of the Oprah Winfrey show.

Notable episodes
Actress Lindsay Lohan appeared on the show in 2016. A leak contract showed that she had originally demanded a fee of $860,000 and an audience with Vladimir Putin if she were to appear on the show.

On Tuesday, February 1, 2017, rape victim Diana was a guest on the show.  She talked about her rape at the hands of a 21-year-old man Semyonov.  Semyonov was sentenced to eight years in a prison colony for “rape” and “violent acts of a sexual nature.” An appellate court later reduced his sentence to three years and three months. Commentators blamed Diana for provoking sexual assault.  Almost all the panelists and most of the audience were clearly on the side of Semyonov. The show spawned many online debates and memes.

In early 2017, Nadezhda Semenyuk, former wife of triathlete Roman Paramonov, went on the show with her ex-husband, who had severely beat her.

References 

2001 Russian television series debuts
2000s Russian television series
Russian television talk shows
Channel One Russia original programming